The Elite Tower is a site in Ramat Gan, Israel, in which various skyscrapers have been planned, but as of March 2015, construction has been cancelled due to delays in the permitting process. At  upon completion, the tower would have been the tallest building in Israel, taking the title from its neighbour, City Gate Tower.

The site was originally purchased by Donald Trump for  $44 million, where he planned to build the Trump Plaza Tower. The project was later purchased by the Azorim Group and was to be constructed on the historic site of the Elite Candy Factory.

History

Originally, the Elite Tower site was purchased for $44 million by American real estate tycoon Donald Trump in association with Crescent Heights Investments. He planned to build the Trump Plaza Tower, but Trump shelved the plans in 2007, when he sold the site on to Azorim for NIS 306.5 million (around $80 million).

Advanced planning for the site was frozen by Azorim as a result of the financial crisis of 2007–2008, but resumed in late 2009.

The all-residential tower would contain 338 residential units. On the 65th floor, the architect confirmed there would be a viewing room as well as a cafe. Construction was expected to begin sometime in 2014 and be completed by 2017.

In early March 2015, purchasers of units in the tower announced that "construction of the tower was canceled, due to a delay in obtaining a permit."

See also
List of skyscrapers in Israel
Architecture of Israel

References

External links

Proposed skyscrapers in Israel
Buildings and structures in Ramat Gan
Residential skyscrapers in Israel
Skyscraper office buildings in Israel